The following is a list of songs recorded by American rapper Big L.

Big L